The following is a list of the 35 municipalities (comuni) of the Province of Siena, Tuscany, Italy.

List

See also 
List of municipalities of Italy

References 

 01
Siena
 
Province of Siena